Mark H. Chignell is a Canadian academic specialising in usability and information science, and as of 2019 is a full professor at the University of Toronto.

Academic career

He has a PhD in psychology (University of Canterbury, New Zealand, 1981), and an MS in Industrial and Systems Engineering (Ohio State, 1984).

After a 1980 PhD titled 'Cognitive mechanisms of categorisation'  at the University of Canterbury, Chignell moved to the University of Toronto, rising to full professor.

In 2003, Chignell founded Vocalage Inc., a company that does usability consulting, outsourced research, and software development.

He participated in a 2003 experiment which gave doctors online access to medical databases through a handheld iPAQ PC, which led to changes in the decisions the doctors made.

Chignell was the general chair of ACM Hypertext 2010.

Selected works 
 Abrams, David, Ronald Baecker, and Mark Chignell. "Information archiving with bookmarks: personal Web space construction and organization." In Conference on Human Factors in Computing Systems, vol. 98, pp. 41–48. 1998.
 Parsaye, Kamran, Mark Chignell, and Setrag Khoshafian. "Intelligent databases. Object-oriented, deductive hypermedia technologies." New York: Wiley, 1989 (1989).
 Parsaye, Kamran, and Mark Chignell. "Expert systems for experts." Earth Systems and Environment (1988).
 Zhao, Shengdong, Pierre Dragicevic, Mark Chignell, Ravin Balakrishnan, and Patrick Baudisch. "Earpod: eyes-free menu selection using touch input and reactive audio feedback." In Proceedings of the Conference on Human Factors in Computing Systems, pp. 1395–1404. ACM, 2007.
 Fitzmaurice, George W., Shumin Zhai, and Mark H. Chignell. "Virtual reality for palmtop computers." ACM Transactions on Information Systems (TOIS) 11, no. 3 (1993): 197–218.

References

External links
  
 
 

Living people
Ohio State University College of Engineering alumni
University of Canterbury alumni
Academic staff of the University of Toronto
1956 births
People educated at St Andrew's College, Christchurch